Auburn University Regional Airport with the Robert G. Pitts Field  is a public use airport located two nautical miles (4 km) east of the central business district of Auburn, a city in Lee County, Alabama, United States. The airport is owned by Auburn University and was formerly known as Auburn–Opelika Robert G. Pitts Airport. It is included in the National Plan of Integrated Airport Systems for 2011–2015, which categorized it as a general aviation facility.

The airport offers no commercial service in or out of Auburn. The closest airport of significance outside Auburn is the Columbus Airport ( via US-280) in Columbus, Georgia, roughly a one-hour drive from Auburn. The closest commercial airports are the Montgomery Regional Airport ( via I-85) in Montgomery, Alabama, the Birmingham–Shuttlesworth International Airport ( via US-280) in Birmingham, Alabama, and the Hartsfield–Jackson Atlanta International Airport ( via I-85) in Atlanta, Georgia. These airports are within a two-hour driving distance from Auburn, and offer air service to most of the world's major airports. Daily bus/van shuttle service is available from the Auburn area to the Atlanta airport.

History 
In its earliest days, the airport was nothing more than a grass field. With one airplane, the airport was very different from its current status. Today, the airport is home to some 97 aircraft and Auburn University's Department of Aviation.

When first constructed in 1930, the Auburn–Opelika Airport was a private airfield built to serve the sister cities of Auburn and Opelika located in Lee County, Alabama. It was also intended to serve the Alabama Polytechnic Institute (API), later renamed Auburn University. Over the next decade, the airport would go from a private airfield, to a stop along the mail route for the Civil Aeronautics Administration, and eventually become a training ground for the U.S. Military. During its time as a Navy/CAA war training school, the Auburn School of Aviation would be developed.

Over the next several decades, many improvements were made to the airport in the general aviation field. A new terminal and administration building was constructed in 1950, consisting of both enclosed and open flight decks, a restaurant, flight ready rooms, classrooms, and operations offices with local, state, and federal funds. Also in the 1950s, medium-intensity runway lights were installed, runways were resealed, and an access road to Glenn Avenue was constructed.

The 1960s continued to see major improvements to the airport; pavement for aircraft parking was completed along with the reconstruction of the 18/36 and 11/29 runways and taxiways. During the 1970s, 1980s and 1990s a concentrated effort was made to acquire the land and funding for the 18/36 runway extension. Renovations and several improvements were made to the airport facilities, updating them to modern standards.

In January 2002, a ribbon-cutting ceremony was held to open the  runway extension.

As of August 2006, the Federal Aviation Administration gave clearance for the installation of a glideslope antenna and approach lighting system (MALSF) for runway 36. These improvements were completed in late 2007. Plans are being made for extensive crack repair, pavement rehab, and painting of runway 11/29, along with minor crack repair and repainting of runway 18/36.

Site prep work for four hangars, a new ramp area, and a new terminal was started in January 2008. These improvements will help the airport provide better service for the large crowds of people who fly in to attend college football games at Auburn University.

In November 2009, the Auburn University Board of Trustees voted to rename the Auburn-Opelika Robert G. Pitts Airport as the Auburn University Regional Airport with the Robert G. Pitts Field.

A new terminal was dedicated in September, 2010.

In July, 2018, the old FBO (serving as the flight education building) was demolished shortly before the newly constructed Delta Air Lines Aviation Education Building was dedicated and opened. That same year, the WWII era hangar and maintenance facilities were demolished and taxiway A, parallel to Runway 18/36, was shifted further west to meet FAA design standards.

Facilities and aircraft 
Auburn University Regional Airport covers an area of 423 acres (171 ha) at an elevation of 777 feet (237 m) above mean sea level. It has two runways with asphalt surfaces: 18/36 is 5,264 by 100 feet (1,604 x 30 m) and 11/29 is 4,000 by 75 feet (1,219 x 23 m).

For the 12-month period ending July 23, 2010, the airport had 65,445 aircraft operations, an average of 179 per day: 97% general aviation, 2% air taxi, and 1% military.
At that time there were 53 aircraft based at this airport: 77% single-engine, 13% multi-engine, 8% jet, and 2% helicopter.

The FBO at the Auburn University Regional Airport is staffed from 7:00 AM to 7:00 PM Central Time (-5, -6z) weekdays, 8:00 AM to 5:00 PM weekends. Fuel services are available during this time, as are use of the FBO and airport facilities. There are additional charges or "call fees" for after hours assistance for fuel or supplies. Services include WSI weather, courtesy cars, aircraft maintenance, oxygen, nitrogen, GPU availability, vending, cable TV, computer workstations, wired and wireless Internet, and LAV service.

Maintenance is available during normal working hours, from 7 AM to 4 PM local time. AUO's four mechanics, three of whom have their Inspection Authorization License (IA), can service most all single engine, twin engine, and turbo-prop aircraft, but provide only minor powerplant and airframe service. After hours and weekend service is available on demand at a rate of time and a half.

Pilot information 

Navaids
 TGE 117.3 055 14.4 nm to field
 CSG 117.1 269 20.6 nm to field
 LOC IAUO 110.1

Airport communications
 CTAF/UNICOM:  123.0
 WX AWOS-3:  132.575 (334-821-4932)
 ATLANTA approach:  126.55 (7000 & above)
 ATLANTA departure:  126.55 (7000 & above)
 APP/P DEP/P:  125.5 (6999 & below)
 Clearance delivery:  118.7

General airport services
 Available fuel:
 100LL
 Jet-A
 Parking includes hangars & tiedowns
 MINOR service
Airframe
Powerplant

References

External links 
 Auburn University Regional Airport, official site
 Aerial image as of March 1997 from USGS The National Map
 
 

Airports in Alabama
Transportation buildings and structures in Lee County, Alabama
Buildings and structures in Auburn, Alabama
Airports established in 1930
1930 establishments in Alabama
University and college airports
Auburn University
University and college buildings in the United States